The 1981 World Judo Championships were the 12th edition of the Men's World Judo Championships, and were held in Maastricht, Netherlands from 3–6 September, 1981.

Medal overview

Men

Medal table

References

External links
 

 videos found by de.video.search.yahoo.com retrieved December 10, 2013

World Judo Championships
W
Judo competitions in the Netherlands
J
J
Judo
September 1981 sports events in Europe